Elythranthera, commonly known as enamel orchids, was a previously accepted genus of flowering plants in the orchid family, Orchidaceae. It contained two species and a named hybrid, all endemic to the south-west of Western Australia. The genus was first formally described in 1963 by the Australian botanist Alex George who published his description in Western Australian Naturalist. Orchids in the genus Elythranthera had previously been included in Glossodia section Elythranthera.

Two species were recognised: 
Elythranthera brunonis (Endl.) A.S.George now known as Caladenia brunonis (Endl.) Rchb.f. - purple enamel orchid; 
Elythranthera emarginata (Lindl.) A.S.George  now known as Caladenia emarginata (Lindl.) Rchb.f. - pink enamel orchid.
A hybrid between the two species was known as Elythranthera x intermedia.  (Fitzg.) M.A.Clem 

In 2015, as a result of studies of molecular phylogenetics, Mark Clements transferred the two Elythranthera species to Caladenia.

Although the change from Elythranthera to Caladenia is recognised by Royal Botanic Gardens, Kew, "Elythranthera" is still used by Australian herbaria, including the Western Australian Herbarium.

References 

Orchids of Australia
Diurideae genera
Caladeniinae
Plants described in 1963
Historically recognized angiosperm genera